Dyckia leptostachya is a plant species in the genus Dyckia. This species is native to Brazil, Bolivia, Paraguay, and Argentina.

Cultivars 
 Dyckia 'Lad Cutak'
 Dyckia 'Red Devil'

References 

leptostachya
Flora of South America
Plants described in 1884
Taxa named by John Gilbert Baker